The 2011 PFF National Men's Under-23 Championship (known as the PFF-Suzuki Under-23 Championship for sponsorship reasons) is a football tournament in the Philippines organized by the Philippine Football Federation (PFF) and Japanese automaker Suzuki. It is the first of its kind in the country.

The tournament was announced after the two bodies agreed on a P3.2 million sponsorship deal for the national tournament. It aims to get the finest under-23 players that would represent the country in the upcoming Under-23 Southeast Asian Games (SEA Games) tournament late in 2011.

On 22 May 2011, Negros Occidental defeated Iloilo with a 12–1 aggregate scoreline to win the title.

The rules
The Under-23 Suzuki championship will adopt the rules and guidelines set by the ASEAN Football Federation.

The tournament will be divided into four clusters: National Capital Region, Luzon, Visayas, and Mindanao. The top two of each will  advance to the national championship in June 2011. In the Finals, the remaining teams will follow a home-and-away format.

Schedule
 March 21 up to 31 - Visayas and Mindanao Cluster Qualifying Round
 April 11 up to 23 - Regional Qualifiers

The officials
 Mariano Araneta - PFF President
 Satoshi Ochida - Suzuki Philippines representative

Timeline
 Late March to May 2011

Mission
In addition, standout players in the tournament will be considered as  part of the national team for the 26th South East Asian Games and the  AFF U-23 tournament in July, which both events will happen in Indonesia  this year.

PFF Suzuki Cup Under-23 National Championship

Quarterfinals
Quarterfinals will divided into two groups and two venues, the Laguna group and the Bacolod group.

The University of the Philippines-Los Baños pitch will be the site for the Laguna group that includes host and Luzon second placer Laguna; Mindanao overall leader Davao; NCR Team A, and Visayas’ number two seed, Iloilo.

Panaad Stadium will be the venue for the group of Visayas’ top seed Bacolod, NCR Team B, Mindanao second placer Dipolog, and Luzon topnotcher, Masbate.

Laguna

 All matches were played in University of the Philippines-Los Baños pitch.

Iloilo and Davao already qualified for semifinals, but there is a protest against Iloilo team.

Bacolod

 All matches were played in the Panaad pitch.

Bacolod and NCR B to semi-finals.

Knockout stage

Semi-finals

Finals
First Leg

Second Leg

NOFA won 12–1 on aggregate.

Awards
The following were the competition’s top individual awardees.
Best Striker: Joshua Beloya (NOFA)
Most Valuable Player: Aldrin Dolino (NOFA)
Best Defender: Camelo Tacusalme (NOFA)
Best Goalkeeper: John Robert Mendoza (NOFA)
Best Midfielder: Francis Gustilo (Iloilo)

References

PFF National Men's Under-23 Championship seasons
2011 in Philippine football
Sports in Negros Occidental
Sports in Iloilo